The Twenty-seventh Amendment (Amendment XXVII, also known as the Congressional Compensation Act of 1789) to the United States Constitution prohibits any law that increases or decreases the salary of members of Congress from taking effect until after the next election of the House of Representatives has occurred. It is the most recently adopted amendment but was one of the first proposed.

The 1st Congress submitted the amendment to the states for ratification on September 25, 1789, along with 11 other proposed amendments (Articles I–XII). The last ten Articles were ratified in 1791 to become the Bill of Rights, but the first two, the Twenty-seventh Amendment and the proposed Congressional Apportionment Amendment, were not ratified by enough states to come into force with them.

The proposed congressional pay amendment was largely forgotten until 1982, when Gregory Watson, a 19-year-old sophomore at the University of Texas at Austin, wrote a paper for a government class in which he claimed that the amendment could still be ratified. He later launched a nationwide campaign to complete its ratification. The amendment eventually became part of the United States Constitution, effective May 5, 1992, completing a record-setting ratification period of 202 years, 7 months, and 10 days, beating the previous record set by the Twenty-second Amendment of 3 years and 343 days.

The idea behind this amendment is to reduce corruption in the legislative branch by requiring an election before a congressperson's salary increase takes effect. The public can thus remove members of Congress from office before their salaries increase. It is unclear if the amendment produced any change in congressional behavior.

Text

Historical background 

Several states raised the issue of Congressional salaries as they debated whether to ratify the Constitution.

North Carolina's ratifying convention proposed several amendments to the Constitution, including the following: "The laws ascertaining the compensation of senators and representatives, for their services, shall be postponed in their operation until after the election of representatives immediately succeeding the passing thereof; that excepted which shall first be passed on the subject." Virginia's ratifying convention recommended an identical amendment.

New York's declaration of ratification was accompanied by a similar amendment proposal: "That the Compensation for the Senators and Representatives be ascertained by standing law; and that no alteration of the existing rate of Compensation shall operate for the Benefit of the Representatives, until after a subsequent Election shall have been had."

Proposal by Congress 

This amendment was one of several proposed amendments to the Constitution that Representative James Madison of Virginia introduced in the House of Representatives on June 8, 1789. Madison's original intent was that it be added to the end of Article I, Section 6, Clause 1 of the Constitution ("The Senators and Representatives shall receive a Compensation for their Services, to be ascertained by Law, and paid out of the Treasury of the United States"). This and Madison's other proposals were referred to a committee consisting of one representative from each state. After emerging from committee, the full House debated the issue and, on August 24, 1789, passed it and 16 other articles of amendment. The proposals went next to the Senate, which made 26 substantive alterations. On September 9, 1789, the Senate approved a culled and consolidated package of 12 articles of amendment.

On September 21, 1789, a House–Senate conference committee convened to resolve numerous differences between the House and Senate Bill of Rights proposals. On September 24, 1789, the committee issued its report, which finalized 12 proposed amendments for the House and Senate to consider. The House agreed to the conference report that day, and the Senate concurred the next day.

What would become the Twenty-seventh Amendment was listed second among the 12 proposals sent on September 25, 1789, to the states for their consideration. Ten of these, numbers 3–12, were ratified 27 months later and are known as the Bill of Rights. The remaining proposal, the Congressional Apportionment Amendment, has not been ratified by enough states to become part of the Constitution.

Revival of interest 

This proposed amendment was largely forgotten until Gregory Watson, an undergraduate student at the University of Texas at Austin, wrote a paper on the subject in 1982 for a political science course. In the paper, Watson argued that the amendment was still "live" and could be ratified. Watson received a "C" grade for his paper from one of the course's teaching assistants. Watson appealed the grade to the course instructor, Sharon Waite, who declined to overrule the teaching assistant. Waite has said, "I kind of glanced at it, but I didn't see anything that was particularly outstanding about it and I thought the C was probably fine". Watson responded by starting a new push for ratification with a letter-writing campaign to state legislatures.

In Dillon v. Gloss, the Supreme Court remarked that "ratification [of a proposed constitutional amendment] must be within some reasonable time after the proposal", and suggested that it was "quite untenable" to view proposed amendments from 1789, 1810, and 1861 as still pending.

But in Coleman v. Miller, the court ruled that the validity of state ratifications of a constitutional amendment is a political matter, and thus not properly assigned to the judiciary. It also held that as a political question, it was up to Congress to determine whether an amendment with no time limit for ratification is still viable after a long time based on "the political, social and economic conditions which have prevailed during the period since the submission of the amendment".

Watson used $6,000 of his own money to sponsor his nationwide effort. When Watson began his campaign in early 1982, he was aware of ratification by only six states and erroneously believed that Virginia's 1791 approval was the last action a state had taken. He discovered in 1983 that Ohio had approved the amendment in 1873 as a means of protest against the Salary Grab Act and learned in 1984 that Wyoming had done the same in 1978, as a protest against a 1977 congressional pay raise. Watson also did not know until 1997, well after the amendment's adoption, that Kentucky had ratified the amendment in 1792. Neither did Kentucky lawmakers themselvesin Watson's desire for a 50-state sweep, the Kentucky General Assembly post-ratified the amendment in 1996 (Senate Joint Resolution No. 50), at Watson's request, likewise unaware that the task had already been attended to 204 years earlier.

In April 1983, Maine became the first state to ratify the amendment as a result of Watson's campaign, followed by Colorado in April 1984. Numerous state legislatures followed suit, with some reaffirming the amendment despite having affirmed it centuries ago. Michigan and New Jersey rushed to be the 38th state to ratify the amendment, but Michigan was faster. It ratified the amendment on May 7, 1992, resulting in the certification of the amendment. New Jersey was disappointed, but ratified the amendment regardless, overturning its rejection of the amendment centuries earlier.

In 2016, Zach Elkins, a professor in the University of Texas at Austin Department of Government, became interested in Watson's story and began to document its origins. He tracked down Sharon Waite, who had left academia in the 1980s to work on her family's citrus farm. Elkins suggested to Waite that they change Watson's grade. In 2017, Elkins submitted a grade change form with Waite's signature and a grade change to A+. In an interview, Waite said, "Goodness, he certainly proved he knew how to work the Constitution and what it meant and how to be politically active, [...] So, yes, I think he deserves an A after that effortA-plus!" A+ is not a valid grade at UT, so Watson's grade may have been changed to an A, though Elkins urged the registrar to leave it as the only A+ ever recorded at the University of Texas. In the same year, the Texas Legislature passed a congratulatory resolution in response to Watson's successful grade change and his overall political participation.

Ratification by the states 

The following states ratified the Twenty-seventh Amendment:

 Maryland – December 19, 1789
 North Carolina – December 22, 1789 (Reaffirmed on July 4, 1989)
 South Carolina – January 19, 1790
 Delaware – January 28, 1790
 Vermont – November 3, 1791
 Virginia – December 15, 1791
 Kentucky – June 27, 1792 (Reaffirmed on March 21, 1996)
 Ohio – May 6, 1873
 Wyoming – March 6, 1978
 Maine – April 27, 1983
 Colorado – April 22, 1984
 South Dakota – February 21, 1985
 New Hampshire – March 7, 1985 (After rejection on January 26, 1790)
 Arizona – April 3, 1985
 Tennessee – May 28, 1985
 Oklahoma – July 1, 1985
 New Mexico – February 14, 1986
 Indiana – February 24, 1986
 Utah – February 25, 1986
 Arkansas – March 13, 1987
 Montana – March 17, 1987
 Connecticut – May 13, 1987
 Wisconsin – July 15, 1987
 Georgia – February 2, 1988
 West Virginia – March 10, 1988
 Louisiana – July 7, 1988
 Iowa – February 9, 1989
 Idaho – March 23, 1989
 Nevada – April 26, 1989
 Alaska – May 6, 1989
 Oregon – May 19, 1989
 Minnesota – May 22, 1989
 Texas – May 25, 1989
 Kansas – April 5, 1990
 Florida – May 31, 1990
 North Dakota – March 25, 1991
 Missouri – May 5, 1992
 Alabama – May 5, 1992
 Michigan – May 7, 1992

On May 18, 1992, the Archivist of the United States, Don W. Wilson, certified that the amendment's ratification had been completed. Michigan's May 7, 1992, ratification was believed to be the 38th state, but it later came to light that the Kentucky General Assembly had ratified the amendment during that state's initial month of statehood, making Alabama (which acted after Missouri on May 5, 1992) the state to finalize the amendment's addition to the Constitution.

The amendment was subsequently ratified by:

  New Jersey – May 7, 1992 (After rejection on November 20, 1789)
 Illinois – May 12, 1992
 California – June 26, 1992
 Rhode Island – June 10, 1993 (After rejection on June 7, 1790)
 Hawaii – April 29, 1994
 Washington – April 6, 1995
 Nebraska – April 1, 2016

Four states have not ratified the Twenty-seventh Amendment: Massachusetts, Mississippi, New York, and Pennsylvania.

Affirmation of ratification 
On May 19, 1992, the Twenty-seventh Amendment's certificate of ratification, signed by the Archivist of the United States, Don W. Wilson, on May 18, 1992, was printed and published in the Federal Register.

In certifying that the amendment had been duly ratified, the Archivist of the United States had acted under statutory authority granted to his office by the Congress under , which states:

The response in Congress was sharp. Senator Robert Byrd of West Virginia scolded Wilson for certifying the amendment without congressional approval. Although Byrd supported congressional acceptance of the amendment, he contended that Wilson had deviated from "historic tradition" by not waiting for Congress to consider the ratification's validity, given the extremely long time since the amendment had been proposed. Speaker of the House Tom Foley and others called for a legal challenge to the ratification.

On May 20, 1992, under the authority recognized in Coleman, and in keeping with the precedent established by the ratification of the Fourteenth Amendment, each house of the 102nd Congress passed its own version of a concurrent resolution agreeing that the amendment was validly ratified, despite the more than 202 years the task took. The Senate's approval of the resolution was unanimous (99 to 0) and the House vote was 414 to 3.

Cost-of-living adjustments 
Congressional cost-of-living adjustments (COLA) have been upheld against legal challenges based on this amendment. In Boehner v. Anderson, the United States Court of Appeals for the District of Columbia Circuit ruled that the Twenty-seventh Amendment does not affect annual COLAs. In Schaffer v. Clinton, the United States Court of Appeals for the Tenth Circuit ruled that receiving such a COLA does not grant members of the Congress standing in federal court to challenge it; the Supreme Court did not hear either case, and so has never ruled on this amendment's effect on COLAs.

See also 
 List of amendments to the United States Constitution
 List of proposed amendments to the United States Constitution
 United States Bill of Rights

References

Citations

General sources 
  The Library of Congress' regularly updated online version.

External links 

 National Archives: Bill of Rights including Twenty-seventh Amendment
 Library of Congress Bill of Rights Primary Documents links page
 Congressional resolutions recognizing ratification:
 
 
 Certification of the 27th Amendment at National Archives Online Public Access
 The Unlikely Story of the 27th Amendment, interview of Gregory Watson by the Dallas County Community College District on YouTube
 Washington Post Constitutional podcast about the ratification of the 27th Amendment (with transcript)
 Recording of the debate in the House of Representatives on the 27th Amendment on C-SPAN
 Harvard Professor Jane Mansbridge podcast discussing the connection between the 27th Amendment and the proposed Equal Rights Amendment
 Gregory Watson's Fight for the 27th Amendment (The Daily Show, interview with Michael Kosta, published to YouTube on May 4, 2018)
 Will the Constitution ever be amended again? We asked the man behind the Twenty-Seventh Amendment. Govtrackinsider.com interview with Gregory Watson 

1789 in American law
1789 in American politics
1992 in American law
1992 in American politics
1st United States Congress
Amendments to the United States Constitution
Legislative branch of the United States government
Salaries of office-holders